Ching may refer to:

People
 Ching (given name), a unisex name
 Ching (surname), a romanization of some Chinese surnames such as Jing, Qing, Cheng and Zhuang
 Ching Hammill (1902–1925), American football player
 Ivan Ching Johnson (1898–1979), Canadian National Hockey League player
 Ching, nickname of Willis Augustus Lee (1888–1945), World War II US Navy vice admiral
 Ching Lau Lauro, stage name of an English magician popularly known as Ching (flourished 1827–1840), true identity unknown
 Ching Shih (1775–1844), also known as Madame Ching, a notorious and highly successful Chinese pirate

Other uses
 Ching (instrument), a Thai and Cambodian musical instrument
 "Ching" (song), a single from Swami's album Equalize (2007)
 Ching, a fictional 12-year-old Chinese swordswoman in the TV show Pucca
 Ching chong, and ching chang chong, pejorative terms that mock or play on the Chinese language or Asian people perceived to be Chinese or people of Chinese appearance
 Qing dynasty of Imperial China, romanized as "Ch'ing" in Wade–Giles
 River Ching, a tributary of the River Lea in north east London

See also
 Chingy, American  hip hop artist
 Chingford, a borough of London
 Jing (disambiguation) (Ching is the Wade–Giles equivalent of Jing)
 Qing (disambiguation) (Ch'ing is the Wade–Giles equivalent of Qing)
 Chink
 I Ching (disambiguation)

Lists of people by nickname